Arthrobacter castelli is a bacterium species from the genus Arthrobacter which has been isolated from biofilm from mural paintings in the Saint-Catherine chapel in Herberstein, Austria.

References

Further reading

External links
Type strain of Arthrobacter castelli at BacDive -  the Bacterial Diversity Metadatabase

Bacteria described in 2005
Micrococcaceae